Mario López Estrada (21 March 1938 – 20 March 2023) was Guatemala's first billionaire and a telecommunications businessman. He was the president and main shareholder of Tigo Guatemala.

Biography
Mario López studied Civil Engineering in Guatemala's San Carlos University. He supposedly started his professional career working as a public employee in Municipalidad de Guatemala (Guatemala City Hall) and Central Government. He then became an entrepreneur in the construction of roads across Guatemala and later housing projects. In 1972, he founded Constructora Maya, an independent construction company.

From 1986 to 1991, he worked as Ministro de Comunicaciones, Infraestructura y Vivienda (Minister for Communications, Infrastructure and Housing) during the first democratic government in Guatemala, with ex-president Vinicio Cerezo. In 1993, he acquired a share of Comunicaciones Celulares, the state-owned, monopolistic telecommunications company that was about to be privatized. His participation in Comcel grew to 45% through successive share purchases. Comcel became the country's largest mobile phone service provider and was renamed Tigo Guatemala. In 2021, Millicom purchased López Estrada's 45% stake in Tigo for $2.2 billion.

In 2015, he became a billionaire, according to Forbes. Mario Lopez Estrada is also the founder and President of the Board of Directors of Tigo Foundation. According to its website, Tigo Foundation is dedicated to support children in Guatemala with healthcare, education and sports. Their website also cites that from its foundation in 2009 to 2017, 250 schools have been built in the rural areas in Guatemala.

He is also a minority stakeholder in the local newspaper Prensa Libre.

Distinctions

 May 2017: "Excellence in Business Recognition" from Forbes during the Genius Disruption forum in Guatemala city

See also 

 Carlos Slim

References

Living people
Guatemalan businesspeople
Guatemalan billionaires
1938 births